This is a list of notable people affiliated with Uppsala University.

For a list of chancellors of the university, see Chancellor of Uppsala University.

Nobel laureates affiliated with Uppsala University

Government, politics and civil service

Royalty

International work

Swedish politicians

Non-Swedes 

Stane Dolanc (1925–1999), Yugoslav (Slovenian) politician, head of the security service under Tito
Onésimo Silveira, Cape Verdean diplomat, politician and writer (Ph.D., Political science, 1976)
Guðmundur Steingrímsson (born 1972), Icelandic politician

Religion 

As Uppsala University has one of only two faculties of theology in Sweden, and the older one of the two (the other is in Lund), most Swedish churchmen of note have actually graduated from the university.

Israel Acrelius (1714–1800),  Lutheran missionary to New Sweden; author of History of New Sweden
Johan Campanius (1601–1683), Lutheran clergyman assigned to  New Sweden
Nicolaus Olai Campanius (1593–1624), priest
Lars Levi Laestadius (1800–1861), clergyman and botanist, founder of the conservative laestadian movement
Nathan Söderblom (1866–1931), professor of comparative religion; later archbishop of Uppsala and Nobel peace laureate in 1931
Emanuel Swedenborg (1688–1772), scientist, philosopher and religious mystic
Carl Aaron Swensson (1857–1904), American Lutheran minister; founder of Bethany College
Gustaf Unonius (1810–1902), Episcopalian priest

Natural sciences and medicine

Mathematics, physics and astronomy

Chemistry, geology and mineralogy

Medicine and life sciences

Explorers 

 Sven Hedin (1865–1952; fil. kand. 1888; honorary doctorate 1935), known for his travels through Central Asia; last person to be ennobled in Sweden
 Finn Malmgren (1895–1928), Arctic explorer (Ph.D. in meteorology 1927, participated in several Arctic expeditions and died in one 1928)

Humanities and social sciences

Industry 

 Christopher Polhem (1661–1751) 
 Gustaf de Laval (1845–1913), engineer, co-founder of the present Alfa Laval
 Jan Stenbeck (1942–2002)
 Karl Jöreskog (1935–) Professor Emeritus, a co-author (with Dag Sörbom) of LISREL statistical program
 Hans Dalborg (1941–)  
 Carl-Henric Svanberg (1952–)
 Maarit Toivanen (1954-), Finnish business executive and Vuorineuvos
 Gunilla Asker (1962–) CEO of Svenska Dagbladet. 
 Niklas Zennström (1966–)

Arts

Literature

Music 

 Prince Gustaf, Duke of Uppland (1827–1852), song composer, matriculated 1844 and studied several semesters in Uppsala
 Gunnar Wennerberg, composer, politician and civil servant
 Hugo Alfvén, composer, director musices of Uppsala University
 Wilhelm Stenhammar, composer, director musices of Uppsala University
 Lars-Erik Larsson, composer, director musices of Uppsala University
 Herbert Blomstedt, orchestral conductor
 Petter Askergren (known as "Petter"), Swedish rap artist
 Rickard Westman, member of folk music group Garmarna

Theatre and entertainment 

 Tage Danielsson, writer and entertainer (matriculated 1949, MA 1955, was vice chairman of Uppsala Student Union)

References

 
Uppsala